Marc Jerome Swartz (31 October 1931 – 14 December 2011) was an American political and cultural anthropologist specializing in eastern Africa.

Born in Omaha, Nebraska, Swartz trained in anthropology in the interdisciplinary Department of Social Relations at Harvard, receiving his PhD in 1958.

He was a founding member of the Department of Anthropology at the University of California, San Diego, where he served as a member of the faculty for 36 years. During his career, Swartz was a founding member of the Society for Cultural Anthropology, former chairman of the American Society for Political Anthropology, a life member of the American Anthropological Association, a fellow of the Royal Anthropological Institute and a member of the National Geographic Research board of editors.

Swartz conducted extensive field research among indigenous peoples in highland Tanzania (the Bena), in Kenya (coastal Swahili, and on Chuuk atoll (formerly known as Truk) in the southwestern Pacific Ocean. In each case he was accompanied and assisted by his wife of 58 years, Audrey. Swartz dedicated his career to the study of the influence of culture over various aspects of human interaction, including the sources and maintenance of political power, social status, aggression, sexuality and medical beliefs. “He believed that human cultures were defined by common understandings that were shared, transmitted, prescriptive and morally forceful. He disputed the casual use of the word ‘culture’ to refer to artifacts or behaviors. To him, culture was what's in your head,” said David K. Jordan, UC San Diego professor emeritus of anthropology and a longtime friend and colleague to Swartz.

In addition to many scholarly papers, he wrote and edited a number of books, including “The Way the World Is,” “Local Level Politics,” “Political Anthropology” (with Victor Turner and Arthur Tuden) and, with David K. Jordan, “Culture, the anthropological perspective,” “Personality and the Cultural Construction of Society” and a textbook, “Anthropology: Perspective on Humanity.”

References

1931 births
2011 deaths
Writers from Omaha, Nebraska
Harvard University alumni
University of California, San Diego faculty
Cultural anthropologists
American male writers